Cleveland is a suburb of the City of Wollongong to the west of Dapto.

The Geographical Names Board of New South Wales assigned the name of Cleveland to the suburb on 5 August 2005. The name was derived from a historical farmhouse, which was located in the southwest of the suburb. The City of Wollongong and the New South Wales government have developed plans over many years for suburban development in the area.

References

Suburbs of Wollongong